Sonic Mass is the fourth and final studio album by the British crust punk band Amebix, released on 23 September 2011 via the band's own label, Amebix Records. It was also their first full-length album since 1987's Monolith.

An animated music video was made for the track "Knights of the Black Sun"; it was released on 3 June 2011.

Track listing

Personnel
Amebix
 The Baron Rockin von Aphid (Rob Miller) — vocals, bass
 Stig Da Pig (Chris Miller) — guitars
 Roy Mayorga — drums, keyboards

Miscellaneous staff
 Joe Willes — assistant engineer
 Toby Hanson — second engineer
 Roy Mayorga — engineering, mixing, production
 Ted Jensen — mastering
 Fin McAteer — design, art direction, photography
 Andy Lefton — artwork

References

2011 albums
Amebix albums